Abe & Bruno is an American family movie of 2006 directed by 
Henri Charr and starring Kevin Scott Allen and Blythe Metz.

The film was released on DVD in 2014.

Outline
Abe (Brad Sergi) is living in a cabin in the woods with his pet mountain gorilla, Bruno, stolen from a zoo. After scaring off some children who were on his property, Abe has a heart attack and collapses. Bruno then sets out for the nearest village to get help, but is considered dangerous.
 
Sheriff Kilgore (Kevin Scott Allen) leads a posse to capture Bruno, and the men arrive at Abe's cabin in time to save Abe. However, Bruno remains on the run. Kilgore's men set bear traps to catch him. Sara (Blythe Metz), a reporter for Zoo TV, discovers Bruno's real identity, and the law is now after him in earnest, to return him to the zoo.

Reception
The Dove Foundation said of the film, as released on DVD

Another reviewer notes that Abe and Bruno are roommates and best friends, "one is a neat freak, the other a regular slob". Abe is the one considered a slob.

The DVD Talk review says

Cast
Brad Sergi as Abe
Kevin Scott Allen as Sheriff Kilgore
Blythe Metz as Sara
Noah Crawford as Shawn
Mario Luna as TV news reporter
Eric Clarke as Reporter 
Darla Coele as Lounge Singer
Jorden Davis as Brandon
Gregory Franklin as Dr. Field
Nadia Lieb as Wendy
Candice Rose as Edie
Maile Stone as Cowboy's daughter
Janet Vincent Lee as TV News Reporter
David McCoy as Man Chased by Gorilla

Notes

External links
"Abe & Bruno", IMDb
"Abe & Bruno", TV Guide
"Abe & Bruno Movie Trailer", YouTube

2006 films
American children's adventure films
Films about gorillas
2000s English-language films
2000s American films